Reuben Paterson (born 1973) (Ngāti Rangitihi, Ngāi Tūhoe, Tūhourangi, Scottish) is a New Zealand artist known for using glitter in his works.

Early life 
Paterson's family comes from Matata in the Bay of Plenty, but he grew up in Bucklands Beach in Auckland, where his father Louis Paterson was a landscaper and his mother Sue Foss enjoyed gardening. He became interested in glitter as a medium in the 1990s when he was a student at Elam School of Fine Arts at the University of Auckland.

Paterson graduated from the University of Auckland in 1997 with a Bachelor of Fine Arts, and in the same year was one of three people awarded the Möet et Chandon Arts Fellowship to France, becoming the first Māori recipient and at the time the youngest recipient ever. The fellowship provided Paterson with a six-week stay in France and a chance to experience art in Europe. After the fellowship, Paterson spent time travelling and lived in Bath, England for two years. He returned to New Zealand in 2000 and worked as a primary school teacher before becoming a full-time artist.

Career 

Paterson's father died two months after Paterson's return to New Zealand in 2000, and he created The wharenui that Dad built as a commemoration of his father. This work, which uses glitter, was included in an exhibition shown in Noumea as part of the Eighth Pacific Arts Festival.

He won the Wallace Arts Trust Development Award in 2005. In 2009 – 2010 Paterson exhibited at the Asia Pacific Triennial (APT6) in Brisbane and was honoured by having his work feature on the cover of art magazine Art & Australia.

Paterson became 'artist in residence' at New Plymouth's Govett-Brewster Art Gallery in 2013, and that year created The Golden Bearing, a life-size golden sculpture of a tree.  He was inspired by his father's work as a landscaper. Five versions of the work have been created.

In 2014 ANZ Bank began creating 'GAYTMs': ATM machines covered in artworks supporting the Sydney Mardi Gras, and later the marriage equality bill. In 2015 Paterson created a glitter-covered GAYTM in Ponsonby.

In 2022 Paterson was a judge at the National Contemporary Art Awards. Paterson has announced that he intends to move to New York, in May 2023, for more professional and personal freedom.

Paterson references his Scottish and Māori heritage by using paisley and koru designs in his works, and has said that he is inspired by “wallpaper, Hawaiian shirts, Dad’s ties and my kuia’s party dresses”. Grid designs are also used extensively. As a child, Paterson spent time at Piha, and he credits the sparkling black sand and sea there as an influence on his extensive use of glitter. As well as glitter, Paterson uses diamond dust and theatre foil in his works. Paterson has stated:I think of how light is a visual metaphor for spiritual ideas, how religious art used light as a metaphor for the purity of saints and of the gods. The one thing that glitter does is reflect light. So using glitter is a modern interpretation of religious paintings that have informed art's evolution and history, and my response to all of that.

References 

New Zealand artists
21st-century New Zealand artists
21st-century artists
1973 births
21st-century New Zealand male artists
New Zealand Māori artists
Living people